Nathan Joel Foley (born 27 September 1979) is an Australian singer-songwriter and television personality. He was an original member of Australian children's musical group Hi-5.

Early life
Foley started singing professionally at 10 years old with bands singing Jazz, Soul, R&B, Pop and Rock in clubs in Sydney, Australia. During his school years, Foley performed in the Coca-Cola Schools Spectacular for seven years as a soloist working with big bands and orchestra's and graduated from the Talent Development Project in 1997.

Career
In 1998, Foley joined the Australian children's musical group Hi-5 as an original member; touring and filming the related television series for ten years. Foley announced his departure from the group in November 2008, expressing interest in focusing on his adult music career. He was replaced by Tim Maddren.

In 2009, Foley completed a season of Jerry Springer: The Opera  at the Sydney Opera House and played Kenickie in the Olivia Newton-John Foundation musical Grease on the Beach. He also performed as a soloist in 2009 at The V8 Supercars and World Masters Games, and sung the National Anthem at the Darling Harbour Australia Day Celebrations in 2010 in front of quarter of a million people.

Foley performed in the musical Mamma Mia!, touring Australia in 2010. He was also Co-Presenter of a show called Gathering on Foxtel’s Indigenous Network NITV. Also in 2011, he worked as a traffic reporter at the Australian Traffic network delivering traffic reports for Ten News, Mix 106.5, 101.7 WSFM, 2GO, Sea FM, Triple M, 2GW and 2UE.

Foley was a top 3 contestant on the Network Ten show I Will Survive.

In 2016, Foley won Princess cruises Entertainer of the year for his big band solo shows being the first Australian to win this title.

In 2019, Foley auditioned for The Voice and was placed on Delta Goodrem's team. Foley was eliminated in the first Knock-out rounds.

Personal life
In 2002, Foley entered a relationship with fellow Hi-5 member, Kellie Crawford (née Hoggart). The couple were engaged in 2005, however called off the wedding plans in late 2006.

Foley married Jamaican model Nicolette Gomex in March 2019 and had their first child, Jackson Joel Foley in December 2019.

Discography

Studio albums

Live albums

Filmography

Awards and nominations

References

External links

Living people
Australian children's musicians
Australian male dancers
Australian people of Irish descent
Australian people of Swedish descent
Indigenous Australian musicians
People educated at Newtown High School of the Performing Arts
1979 births
21st-century Australian singers
21st-century Australian male singers